St. Leonard's Secondary School (The Lenny) was a Catholic, mixed-sex, comprehensive secondary school located in Easterhouse, Glasgow.

It was permanently closed in 1998 to pupils, and soon after was demolished. On the same ground now stands St. Benedict's Roman Catholic Primary School.

The majority of pupils were relocated to St Andrew's Secondary.

References

Defunct Catholic secondary schools in Scotland
Demolished buildings and structures in Scotland
Educational institutions disestablished in 1998
Educational institutions established in 1966
Defunct secondary schools in Glasgow
1966 establishments in Scotland
1998 disestablishments in Scotland

pl:St Leonard's (Glasgow)
pl:St Leonard's Secondary School
pl:St. Leonard's Secondary School